Air Training Wing is the Royal Australian Air Force (RAAF) unit responsible for providing basic training for the force's pilots and aircrew, and training instructors. It also oversees the RAAF Museum.

Structure
Air Training Wing forms part of the Air Force Training Group, alongside the Ground Training Wing, Reserve Training Wing, and RAAF College. Its headquarters is located at RAAF Base East Sale in Gippsland, Victoria.

As of 2015, the wing comprised the following units:
No. 2 Flying Training School at RAAF Base Pearce, Western Australia
No. 32 Squadron at RAAF Base East Sale
Australian Defence Force Basic Flying Training School at Tamworth, New South Wales
Central Flying School at RAAF Base East Sale
Combat Survival Training School at RAAF Base Townsville
School of Air Warfare at RAAF Base East Sale
School of Air Traffic Control at RAAF Base East Sale
RAAF Museum at RAAF Williams (Point Cook base)

References
Citations

Works consulted

RAAF wings